Dougherty (formerly Doughtery) is a small unincorporated community in Floyd County, Texas, United States.

History
Dougherty was established in 1928 and named for Francis M. Dougherty. A school was built in 1929.

Geography
Dougherty is located on the high plains of the Llano Estacado in West Texas.

Education
It is within the Floydada Independent School District. The Dougherty Independent School District consolidated into the former on July 1, 1987.

See also
Becton, Texas
Estacado, Texas
Heckville, Texas
Blanco Canyon
Mount Blanco
White River (Texas)

References

External links

Public domain photos of West Texas and the Llano Estacado 

Unincorporated communities in Floyd County, Texas
Unincorporated communities in Texas